The R151 road is a regional road in Ireland. It runs from Bettystown to Mornington, in County Meath.

References

Regional roads in the Republic of Ireland
Roads in County Meath